Daniel Martins may refer to:

Daniel Martins (footballer, born 1972), Brazilian–Equatoguinean footballer
Daniel Martins (Portuguese footballer) (born 1993)
Dan Martins, or Daniel Hayden Martins, American bishop
Daniel Martins (athlete) (born 1996), Brazilian Paralympic athlete

See also
Daniel Guimarães (born 1987), Brazilian footballer
Daniel Martens (born 1999), Singaporean footballer